Black Hill Roman Camps  are two Roman camps that are part of an extensive complex of Roman military sites centred around the fort at Ardoch, Perth and Kinross, Scotland. They were built during the re-conquest of Scotland by the emperor Septimius Severus.

References

Roman fortified camps in Scotland